Plug board may refer to:

 Plugboard, a component of certain encryption machines, unit record equipment and some early computers
 Telephone switchboard, another name for a manual exchange
 Power strip a device that plugs into a power socket to increase the number of power sockets available for other devices

See also
 Patch panel, a number of circuits, usually of the same or similar type, which appear on jacks for monitoring, interconnecting, and testing circuits in a convenient, flexible manner
 Plug (disambiguation)
 Perforated hardboard, tempered hardboard which is pre-drilled with evenly spaced holes. The holes are used to accept pegs or hooks to support various items, such as tools in a workshop